Rēnata Tama-ki-Hikurangi Kawepō (? – 14 April 1888) was a New Zealand Māori leader and missionary. Of Māori descent, he identified with the Ngāi Te Ūpokoiri and Ngāti Kahungunu iwi.

As a young man in 1827, he was among the Ngāi Te Ūpokoiri forces besieged at the island fortress on Lake Rotoatara (near Te Aute) by a force of Ngāti Te Whatuiāpiti and Ngāpuhi led by Te Pareihe. After a two month siege it became clear that the fortress was going to fall and he proposed that some of the defenders hand themselves over as hostages to secure safe passage for the rest. When no one else volunteered, he went by himself, saying kia kawe au ki te pō ("let me deliver myself up to the night!"), from which he took the name Kawepō.

As a prisoner, he was taken first to Manawatu and later to Auckland. William Colenso later brought him back to Hawke's Bay. 

He established St John's Church at Omahu. A memorial for him and those who fought alongside him in battle was placed in the cemetery of St John's Church by the government; approved in 1928 and completed in 1929.

References

Bibliography

1888 deaths
New Zealand Anglican missionaries
Ngāti Kahungunu people
New Zealand Māori religious leaders
Year of birth unknown
Anglican missionaries in New Zealand
People from the Hawke's Bay Region